This is a list of gliders/sailplanes of the world, (this reference lists all gliders with references, where available) 
Note: Any aircraft can glide for a short time, but gliders are designed to glide for longer.

Lithuanian miscellaneous constructors 
 Bėkšta RB-11 – Romualdas Bėkšta
 BrO-11 - 1954 - by Bronius Oškinis
 Garalevičiaus-Kulvinskio GK-1 – GARALEVIČIAUS, J. & A. Kulvinskas
 LAK-9 - 1976 - by Kęstutis Gečas (ESAG)
 LAK-12 - 1979 - by Kęstutis Gečas (senior constructor at )
 LAK-14 - 1981 - by Antanas Paknys (ESAG)
 LAK-15 - 1989 - by J. Bankauskas (ESAG)
 LAK-16 - 1986 - by Gintaras Sabaliauskas and Kęstutis Leonavičius (ESAG)
 LAK-17
 LAK-19 - 2001
 LAK-20 - 2007
 LAK Genesis 2 - 1994
 BK-7 Lietuva - 1972 by Balys Karvelis
 Kensgailos Žuvėdra – Vladas Kensgaila
 Rimsa Keva – Z. Rimša
 Salaviejus Aitvaras – V. Šalaviejus
 Spriditis (glider) – Edvins Bekmanis
 Senbergas S-1 – 1922, designer V. Senbergas
 Mainelis 1932 glider designed by P. Mainelis, 2 built (based on German glider)
 Skurauskas & Mikevicius Gandras designed by Skurauskas & Mikevicius, 1 built (based on German glider)
 Salavejus primary designed by V. Salavejus primary training gliders, 2 built
 Miliunas & Kontrimas Nida designed by Miliunas & Kontrimas glider (based on German Grunau Baby)
 Gysas Nykstukas designed by A. Gysas
 Gysas Zaibas designed by A. Gysas
 Mainelis Birzietis competition sailplane, designed by P. Mainelis (based on (Gö-3 Minimoa)
 Rimsa-Miliunas Keva motorglider 1 x 28 hp Scott, designed by Z. Rimsa, built by G. Miliunas

Notes

Further reading

External links

Lists of glider aircraft